Sanlı Sarıalioğlu (born 1 January 1945) is a Turkish former footballer and current football columnist and TV pundit. He is a one-club man, served Beşiktaş for 14 years, his entire football career. Sarialioğlu captained Beşiktaş between 1968 and 1975. As of 2013, he writes in the sports section of daily newspaper Yeni Şafak.

International career
Sarialioğlu played once for Turkey U18 national team on 6 November 1963, in a friend game up against Israel. 
He was called up 12 times for U21 level. He was capped 21 times for senior national team, scoring twice.

Honours
Turkey
 RCD Cup: 1967, 1969

Individual
Beşiktaş J.K. Squads of Century (Golden Team)

References

External links
 Sanlı Sarialioğlu on TFF official website
 Sanlı Sarıalioğlu on Beşiktaş official website

1945 births
Living people
Turkish footballers
Turkey international footballers
Footballers from Istanbul
Association football forwards
Turkey youth international footballers
Turkey under-21 international footballers
Beşiktaş J.K. footballers